Barbara Mary "Miki" Hood (9 January 1915 – September, 1994) was an English stage and film actress. She played the female lead in the 1934 film Guest of Honour.

Filmography

References

Bibliography
 Hirschhorn, Clive. The Warner Bros. story. Crown Publishers, 1979.

External links

1915 births
1994 deaths
English stage actresses
English film actresses
People from Brentford
Actresses from London
20th-century English actresses